Paul Horowitz (born 1942) is an American physicist and electrical engineer, known primarily for his work in electronics design, as well as for his role in the search for extraterrestrial intelligence (see SETI).

Biography
At age 8, Horowitz achieved distinction as the world's youngest amateur radio operator.  He went on to study physics at Harvard University (B.A., 1965; M.A., 1967; Ph.D., 1970), where he has also spent all of his subsequent career.  His early work was on scanning microscopy (using both protons and X-rays).  Horowitz has also conducted astrophysical research on pulsars and investigations in biophysics.  His interest in practical electronics has led to a handful of inventions, including an automated voting machine and an acoustic mechanism for landmine detection, and an electronic Morse Code/Baudot code keyboard using a diode matrix and 66 TTL integrated circuits for Amateur Radio use.  Since 1974 he has taught a practical course in electronics whose lecture notes became one of the best known textbooks in the field: The Art of Electronics (coauthored with Winfield Hill).

Horowitz was one of the pioneers of the search of intelligent life beyond the Earth, and one of the leaders behind SETI. This work has attracted both admiration and criticism. Harvard biologist Ernst Mayr has sharply criticized Horowitz for wasting the resources of the university and the efforts of graduate students on such an endeavour. Carl Sagan provided a strong rebuttal to Mayr's criticism, and pointed out that many eminent biologists and biochemists had endorsed SETI with the statement: 
 Sagan was believed to have based the main character in his novel Contact partly on Horowitz.

Horowitz led the META and BETA SETI projects.  Horowitz and Sagan reported that, in the course of project META, they had detected 37 signals "which survived all our cuts" and cannot be positively identified.
On September 10, 1988 the university's 84-foot radio dish detected "an enormous spike which was 750 times noise. If you converted the radio signal into audio it would sound just like a tone. It would sound like a flute." All 37 signals, however, have been single events which have never been heard again. The software company 37signals has been named after these signals.

Horowitz holds professorial appointments at Harvard in both physics and electrical engineering. He has also served as a member of the JASON Defense Advisory Group. One of his doctoral students, John A. Howell, is now Emeritus Professor of Physics at Earlham College.

Works

References

External links
 Official webpage at Harvard
 Research group webpage
 Transcript of interview for PBS's Nova

21st-century American physicists
American science writers
American technology writers
Amateur radio people
Harvard University alumni
1942 births
Living people